Acrobasis minimella is a species of snout moth in the genus Acrobasis. It was described by Émile Louis Ragonot in 1889, and is known from the eastern United States.

The wingspan is about 17 mm.

The larvae feed on Quercus species, including Quercus marilandica, Quercus velutina, Quercus rubra, Quercus falcata, Quercus laevis and Quercus alba.

References

Moths described in 1889
Acrobasis
Moths of North America